Philipp Stiller (born May 20, 1990) is a German footballer who plays for SV Waldhof Mannheim.

External links

1990 births
Living people
German footballers
German people of Polish descent
FSV Oggersheim players
Rot Weiss Ahlen players
K.A.S. Eupen players
SV Waldhof Mannheim players
3. Liga players
Association football fullbacks
People from Worms, Germany
Footballers from Rhineland-Palatinate